is a Japanese politician of the New Komeito Party, a member of the House of Representatives in the Diet (national legislature). A native of Toyama, Toyama and graduate of Tohoku University, he was elected to the House of Representatives for the first time in 1990. He lost his seat in 1993 but was re-elected in 1996.

References

External links
Official website in Japanese.

1947 births
Living people
People from Toyama (city)
Tohoku University alumni
Members of the House of Representatives (Japan)
New Komeito politicians
21st-century Japanese politicians